Hainan is a province of the People's Republic of China.

Hainan may also refer to:


Places in China

Other places in China
Hainan Tibetan Autonomous Prefecture, Qinghai
Hainan District, Wuhai, Inner Mongolia
Hainan, Jiangsu, a town in Xinghua, Jiangsu

Townships
Hainan Township, Hailun, Heilongjiang
Hainan Korean Ethnic Township, Xi'an District, Mudanjiang, Heilongjiang
Hainan Township, Sichuan, in Xichang, Sichuan

Other uses
Hainan Airlines, an airline based in Haikou, Hainan
Hainan people, the indigenous people of Hainan province
Hainan University, Haikou, Hainan
Chinese landing helicopter dock Hainan, Chinese People's Liberation Army Navy ship

See also
Henan, a province in China and 
Hunan, a province in China